Xbox Cloud Gaming (formerly known as Project xCloud and colloquially known as xCloud) is Microsoft's Xbox cloud gaming service. Initially released in beta testing in November 2019, the service later launched for subscribers of Xbox Game Pass Ultimate on September 15, 2020. Xbox Game Pass cloud gaming is provided to subscribers of Ultimate at no additional cost.

Development 
The ideas for the cloud service came within Microsoft around 2016, around the same time that Kareem Choudhry developed the Xbox 360 backwards compatibility for the Xbox One. As his team developed this solution, Choudhry also had the idea if they could provide these games without having need of a console, and got Spencer's go-ahead to start a small team to determine the feasibility of cloud gaming. The technology was deemed successful enough at around the time of Xbox Game Pass's introduction that Microsoft assembled a larger team to build up the cloud gaming platform.

Microsoft teased the service at E3 2018 and formally announced Project xCloud several months later, in October 2018. They demonstrated the service in March 2019 with the racing game Forza Horizon 4 playing on an Android smartphone with an Xbox One controller. Xbox head Phil Spencer used a private server during this time to test games on a remote connection. The service entered its home testing phase in May 2019, when it could be used outside the lab environment. It entered public testing later in the year and was unveiled at E3 2019.

Microsoft said that its Xbox content library will make its service more appealing than competitors such as Stadia. The hardware at launch used Xbox One S-based blade servers, but began to transition to Xbox Series X-based servers in June 2021. Each server initially had four customized Xbox One S-based units for the 2018 teaser, but this was doubled to eight per server in a 2U enclosure for the service's launch in 2019. Compared to the standard Xbox One S, power consumption has been reduced by 30% through processor-specific power tuning. Video output is set for 120 Hz to reduce latency.

Trials of the service began in October 2019, and as of November 2019, the service hosts 50 games, with support in testing for Apple Inc.'s iOS mobile devices, and for Sony Interactive Entertainment's DualShock controllers.

On February 12, 2020, Project xCloud launched on Apple’s mobile operating system in a preview version.

On May 5, 2020, Project xCloud came to Spain (Europe) in preview (Video on live).

Microsoft released Xbox Cloud Gaming across 21 countries in North America and Europe, as well as in South Korea, on September 15, 2020 for select Android devices, with support for more than 150 games at launch.

Xbox Cloud Gaming was released in its beta form for Windows users on August 9, 2021 as a perk of the Xbox Game Pass Ultimate subscription, though also required users to be registered in the Xbox Insider program. It was officially released as part of the Xbox app for Windows on September 14, 2021, along with Remote Play support from Xbox consoles to a Windows computer. Microsoft introduced a Clarity Boost feature for Windows users through the Edge browser that provides client-side visual improvements to the streamed content.

Microsoft began rolling out testing of Xbox Cloud Gaming for Xbox One consoles on test channels in October 2021, allowing users on those consoles to play Xbox Series X/S games.

The internet speed requirements for Xbox Cloud Gaming's service is as follows:

Availability 
Cloud gaming is available in the following 28 countries: Argentina, Australia, Austria, Belgium, Brazil, Canada, Czech Republic, Denmark, Finland, France, Germany, Hungary, Ireland, Italy, Japan, Mexico, Netherlands, New Zealand, Norway, Poland, Portugal, Slovakia, South Korea, Spain, Sweden, Switzerland, the United Kingdom, and the United States. By 2020, Microsoft plans to add more countries over time. As of November 2020, Microsoft started receiving applications from users to participate in preview testing in additional countries.

Games 

The Xbox Series X's backward compatibility allows xCloud to retain the existing library of Xbox games while adding new games from the Xbox Series X. The Xbox Game Pass Library currently lists 382 cloud-enabled games. The list includes Halo: The Master Chief Collection, Forza Horizon 4, The Outer Worlds, Yakuza Kiwami 2, and Microsoft Flight Simulator. Microsoft has also announced plans to expand the list of cloud-enabled games to include select Xbox games that Xbox Game Pass Ultimate members have purchased from the Microsoft Store.

Hellblade: Senua's Sacrifice was the first game to support full touch controls. Touch controls have since been added to another 186 games.

Microsoft introduced cloud play support for selected original Xbox and Xbox 360 titles using its backward compatibility program starting in March 2021 with 16 titles available. Players are able to use cloud-based saved games from the original release of these titles if they have used that service as part of Xbox Live Gold. Some of the games also support official touch controls when played on mobile devices.

Reception 
The service received generally positive initial impressions from reviewers. Playing over a T-Mobile LTE connection with just 25Mbps download speed caused no effect on image quality. Even while playing on a moving bus and train, there was no noticeable loss of image quality.

Reviewers also reported that starting up games on the phone feels faster because the games are running on more powerful remote servers rather than a hard drive on a console. Load times are also minimized and closer to a PC gaming experience.

Hardware 

Xbox Cloud Gaming runs via Microsoft's 54 Azure cloud computing centers, hosted in 140 countries.
Microsoft upgraded its server blades to the more capable Xbox Series X hardware in 2021.

The service is designed to work with phones, either with touchscreen controls or game controller over Bluetooth. Notable supported controller models include:
Official Xbox controllers
Xbox Wireless Controller
Xbox Elite Wireless Controller Series 1 and Series 2
Xbox Adaptive Controller
Razer Inc.
Kishi (Xbox edition)
Kishi v2
Raiju Mobile Gaming Controller for Android
Junglecat
Sony 
DualShock 4 Wireless Controller
DualSense Wireless Controller
SteelSeries 
Stratus XL for Windows, Android, and VR
Stratus Duo for Windows, Chromebook, Android, and VR
Stratus+ for Windows, Chromebook, and Android
Nimbus+ for iPhone, iPad, iPod Touch, and Apple TV
Backbone
Backbone One
PowerA 
MOGA XP5-A Plus
MOGA XP5-i Plus
MOGA XP5-X Plus
MOGA XP7-X Plus
Wired Controller for Xbox Series X|S
Enhanced Wired Controller for Xbox Series X|S
FUSION Pro 2 Wired Controller for Xbox Series X|S

Mobile devices

Android 
Xbox Cloud Gaming works with any Android phone or tablet that has at least Android 6.0 and Bluetooth 4.0. Examples of supported devices include the Samsung Galaxy Tab S5e, the OnePlus 8 and the Galaxy S20 Ultra.

In March 2021, Microsoft released an update to the Android Xbox Cloud Gaming client that allows dual-screened devices like the Surface Duo to use the second screen to host the touch controls. Several notable games such as Minecraft Dungeons and New Super Lucky's Tale support the dedicated gamepad on the second screen.

Some games such as Gears 5 support motion controls using the device's built in gyro and provide a dedicated control scheme when using the gamepad mode.

iOS 
While Microsoft had planned to release xCloud for iOS devices, the company halted iOS testing in August 2020, asserting that policies on the Apple App Store limited what functionality they could provide for the service. Apple clarified that cloud streaming services like xCloud allow Microsoft to release games onto the iOS platform that bypass the normal checks that Apple performs for other apps, and thus refused to allow the app on the platform.

However, in September 2020, Apple altered its rules that allowed xCloud and other cloud gaming apps to work on iOS, with restrictions that each game must be offered as an individual download on the iOS store which the user must use before playing, though catalog apps as part of the service can list and link to these games. Microsoft responded negatively to this change, stating that

Microsoft had considered the possibility of making each game its own application as to satisfy Apple's requirements, according to The Verge based on emails uncovered during the Epic Games v. Apple trial. Microsoft suggested in October 2020 that to work around Apple's restriction, it may bring xCloud to iOS as a browser-based web application, which would not have its content restricted by the App Store limitations. The company later announced that it will use this approach to bring a browser-based version of the cloud gaming service to both personal computers and to iOS devices to be released sometime by the second quarter of 2021. An invite-only beta test of the browser version started on April 20, 2021. The full version for all Xbox Game Pass subscribers was released on June 28, 2021.

Xbox consoles

Microsoft also announced plans to bring cloud gaming to the Xbox One and Xbox Series X/S consoles later in 2021, which would also allow Xbox One users to play games that are only able to run on the Series X/S consoles. The feature was made available on November 17, 2021.

Other devices
Alongside the iOS browser-based version, browser-based Xbox Cloud Gaming through supported browsers in Windows 10 computers was added for Xbox Game Pass subscribers on June 28, 2021. Invite-only beta testing launched alongside the iOS beta test on April 20, 2021. Spencer has also stated that Microsoft is working to bring the service to smart TVs and streaming sticks, though a challenge here is assuring minimal latency between the television and the controller. Microsoft confirmed in May 2022 that a streaming device was in development under the codename Keystone. However, by November 2022, Spencer stated that they had ceased development of this device, as it was too costly compared to the Xbox Series S price and surpassing the $99-$129 price range they had envisioned.

In July 2022, Xbox Cloud Gaming was launched on select Samsung Smart TVs and Smart Monitors via the Xbox app, with support for Bluetooth controllers. Microsoft said that other smart TV brands were being evaluated for the Xbox app for smart TVs.

See also 
 Azure Virtual Desktop
 EA Play
 Windows 365

References

External links 
 

Microsoft cloud services
Cloud gaming services
2019 establishments in the United States
2019 in video gaming
Subscription video game services